This is the complete list of Asian Games medalists in dragon boat in 2010 and 2018.

Men

200 m
 Small boat: 2018

250 m
 Standard boat: 2010

500 m
 Standard boat: 2010
 Small boat: 2018

1000 m
 Standard boat: 2010
 Small boat: 2018

Women

200 m
 Small boat: 2018

250 m
 Standard boat: 2010

500 m
 Standard boat: 2010
 Small boat: 2018

1000 m
 Standard boat: 2010

References

Dragon Boat Results

Dragon boat
medalists